Modulatricidae is a small family of passerine birds which are restricted to Africa.

These species have been taxonomic enigmas in the past, having been moved between the families Muscicapidae, Turdidae, and Timaliidae sensu lato; they are now known to form a clade sister either to the sugarbirds or to the majority of Passeroidea.

Species
 Genus: Modulatrix
 Spot-throat, Modulatrix stictigula
 Genus: Arcanator
 Dapple-throat, Arcanator orostruthus
 Genus: Kakamega
 Grey-chested babbler, Kakamega poilothorax

References